Maurizio Benini (born 1952) is an Italian conductor and composer. He made his debut in 1998 in L'elisir d'amore at the Teatro Comunale di Bologna. Gramophone notes his "spirit and finesse" at conducting. He has also conducted opera performances at La Scala, the Lyric Opera of Chicago, the Metropolitan Opera, the Paris Opera, The Royal Opera, the Vienna State Opera, and the Wexford Festival Opera among others.

References

External links
Biography on Opera Rara

Italian male conductors (music)
Italian male composers
20th-century Italian conductors (music)
20th-century Italian composers
21st-century Italian conductors (music)
21st-century composers
20th-century Italian male musicians
21st-century Italian male musicians
Living people
1968 births